The 2013–14 América season was the 67th professional season of Mexico's top-flight football league. The season is split into two tournaments—the Torneo Apertura and the Torneo Clausura—each with identical formats and each contested by the same eighteen teams. América began their season on July 31, 2013 against Club León.

Liga MX

Torneo Apertura

References

Mexican football clubs 2013–14 season
2013-14